Shade Furnace Archeological District, also known as Old Shade Furnace and Shade Forge, is a national historic district located at Shade Township in Somerset County, Pennsylvania. The district includes four contributing sites and two contributing objects. It encompasses the ruins of a countryside plantation style iron forge operation that operated from 1808 to 1858.  It includes a stone blast furnace structure, a forge site, an ore pit site, a farmstead site, and a late 19th-century coal mine complex.  The area includes a number of archaeological sites associated with the ruins of abandoned buildings.

It was listed on the National Register of Historic Places in 2008.

References

External links
Shade Furnace, Our American Heritage website by Richard Parks

Historic American Engineering Record in Pennsylvania
Historic districts on the National Register of Historic Places in Pennsylvania
Historic districts in Somerset County, Pennsylvania
Archaeological sites on the National Register of Historic Places in Pennsylvania
National Register of Historic Places in Somerset County, Pennsylvania